Robin M. Queen is an American linguist and Professor of Linguistics at the University of Michigan. In 2010 she was named a Arthur F. Thurnau Professor and Professor of Linguistics, English Languages and Literatures, and Germanic Languages and Literatures. She also served as the Chair of the Department of Linguistics at the University of Michigan.

Education and research
Queen earned a B.S. in Linguistics from Georgetown University in 1990, and she received both an M.A. (1993) and Ph.D. (1996) in Linguistics from the University of Texas at Austin. Her Ph.D. dissertation is titled, Intonation in contact: A study of Turkish–German bilingual intonation patterns.

Her work has primarily focused on the language of lesbians and also on bilingual education and culture, especially among those of Turkish descent in Germany. She has also studied the interaction of personality and grammatical views.

Honors 
Queen was elected a Fellow of the Linguistic Society of America in 2015.

Queen served as the co-editor-in-chief of the Journal of English Linguistics from 2006 to 2012.

References

Year of birth missing (living people)
Living people
Linguists from the United States
Georgetown University alumni
University of Texas alumni
University of Michigan faculty
American women academics
Fellows of the Linguistic Society of America
Women linguists
21st-century American women